Herbert Renoth (born 5 February 1962 in Berchtesgaden) is a retired German alpine skier who competed in the 1984 Winter Olympics.

External links

References

1962 births
Living people
German male alpine skiers
Olympic alpine skiers of West Germany
Alpine skiers at the 1984 Winter Olympics
People from Berchtesgaden
Sportspeople from Upper Bavaria
20th-century German people